Late Baliram Kashyap Memorial Government Medical College is a government medical college located in dhimrapal, Jagdalpur, Chhattisgarh, India. It is affiliated to Pt. Deendayal Upadhyay Memorial Health Sciences and Ayush University of Chhattisgarh, Raipur. It is named after Indian politician Baliram Kashyap.

Academics
The institute offers M.B.B.S. with an intake capacity of 125 undergraduates per year.

References

Medical colleges in Chhattisgarh
Colleges affiliated to Pt. Deendayal Upadhyay Memorial Health Sciences and Ayush University of Chhattisgarh
Bastar district
2006 establishments in Chhattisgarh
Educational institutions established in 2006